Pranam Khareedu is a 1978 Indian Telugu-language film. It starred Jayasudha, Rao Gopal Rao, Chandra Mohan, Chiranjeevi, Reshma Roy, and Madhavi in a guest appearance. The film released on 22 September 1978. The film is based on a play written by C. S. Rao. It is the debut film for character actor Kota Srinivasa Rao. Chiranjeevi started his film career with Punadhirallu. However, his first released film was Pranam Khareedu.

Plot
This is a story set to the pre-independence period in India. A village landlord Kanakayya (Rao Gopal Rao) marries Sita (Jayasudha), who is young enough to be his daughter, with the help of village Munsif (Nutan Prasad). However, he restricts her a lot after the marriage. Sita's brother Bangaram (Chalam) comes from the town and eyes Bangari (Reshmi Roy), Kanakayya's deaf and dumb servant Devudu's (Chandramohan) sister. Bangari is in love with Narasimha (Chiranjeevi), another servant of Kanakayya. Bangaram rapes Bangari. Kanakayya suspects that Sita is in love with Devudu, and in a fit of rage, he kills them both one day. People revolt against Kanakayya and kill him at the end.

Cast
 Rao Gopal Rao  as Kanakayya
 Jayasudha as Sita (Kankayya's Second Wife)
 Chandra Mohan as Devudu
 Chiranjeevi as Narasimha
 Reshma Roy as Bangari (Devudu's sister)
 Kaikala Satyanarayana
 Nutan Prasad as Munsif Bullabbai
 Ramaprabha ...  Chaakali Subbi
 Chalam as Bangaram (Sita's brother)
 Madhavi as Venkatalakshmi
 Jit Mohan Mitra
 N. D. Lakshmi
 R. Narayana Murthy
 Kota Srinivasa Rao
 Kota Sankara Rao

Songtrack

 "Bandameeda Undi Gundodi Debba" (Singer: L. R. Eswari)
 "Enniyallo Enniyallo Endaka" (Singers: Chandrasekhar, G. Anand and S. P. Sailaja)
 "Etamesi Todina Eru Endadu" (Singer: S. P. Balasubrahmanyam)
 "Nomallo Mamilla Tota Kada" (Singer: S. Janaki)

References

External links
 

1978 films
1970s Telugu-language films
Indian black-and-white films
Films scored by K. Chakravarthy
Indian films based on plays
Films directed by K. Vasu